Steve Eves formerly held the world record for the tallest and heaviest amateur rocket ever successfully launched. On Saturday April 25, 2009 Eves launched the 1/10 scale replica of the Saturn V rocket  into the air, and successfully recovered it. The launch occurred on the eastern shore of the Chesapeake Bay under supervision of the Maryland-Delaware Rocketry Association. The rocket was powered by a matrix of nine motors: eight 13,000Ns N-Class motors surrounding a central 77,000Ns P-Class motor, for a total of 181,000Ns.

References

Model rocketry
Year of birth missing (living people)
Living people